Honour Me is a 2020 British documentary film produced and directed by Alex Tweddle.

Abandoned by her parents, Sameem Ali spent six and a half years growing up in a children's home. When she was told that her family wanted to take her back she couldn't wait to start her new life with them. Instead, she returned to a dirty house where she was subjected to endless chores. Her mother began to beat her and her unhappiness drove her to self-harm. So Sameem was excited when she boarded a plane with her mother to visit Pakistan for the first time. It was only after they arrived in her family's village that she realised she wasn't there on holiday. Aged just thirteen, Sameem was forced to marry a complete stranger.

When pregnant, two months later, she was made to return to the UK where she suffered further abuse from her family. After finding true love, Sameem fled the violence at home and escaped to Manchester with her young son. She believed she had put her horrific experiences behind her, but was unprepared for the consequences of violating her family's honour.

Honour Me is the true story of Sameem's struggle to break free from her past and fight back against her upbringing.

External links
 
 Sameemali.com

2020 films
British documentary films
British Pakistani films
2020 documentary films
Documentary films about violence against women
Documentary films about child abuse
Violence against women in Pakistan
2020s English-language films
2020s British films